Michael Konelios is a Marshallese politician and government minister.  As of 2012 he was the  Minister of Resources and Development. Konelios was involved in the negotiation with Taiwan to provide solar-powered streetlights to the Marshall Islands.

He was Minister of Finance of the cabinet of Kessai Note from 2000 to 2004.

References

Finance ministers of the Marshall Islands
Government ministers of the Marshall Islands
Members of the Legislature of the Marshall Islands
Marshallese politicians
Living people
Year of birth missing (living people)